The Canton of Le Lorrain is a former canton in the Arrondissement of La Trinité on Martinique. It had 7,294 inhabitants (2012). It was disbanded in 2015. The canton comprised the commune of Le Lorrain.

References

Cantons of Martinique